Quaade is a surname. Notable people with the surname include:

Michelle Lauge Quaade (born 1991), Danish cyclist
Rasmus Quaade (born 1990), Danish cyclist
 (born 1889), Danish painter

See also 
Quade